Liolaemus tristis is a species of lizard in the family Iguanidae or the family Liolaemidae. The species is endemic to Argentina.

References

tristis
Lizards of South America
Reptiles of Argentina
Endemic fauna of Argentina
Reptiles described in 1997
Taxa named by José Miguel Alfredo María Cei